James Norris Gillett (September 20, 1860 – April 20, 1937) was an American lawyer and politician. A Republican involved in federal and state politics, Gillett was elected both a member of the U.S. House of Representatives from California from March 4, 1903, to November 4, 1906, and as the 22nd governor of California from January 9, 1907, to January 3, 1911.

Biography 
James Gillett was born in Viroqua, Wisconsin, on September 20, 1860. As a young child, Gillett moved with his parents to Sparta, Wisconsin at the age of five. He remained in Sparta for nearly fifteen years, attending the town's grammar and high school. In 1881, Gillett was admitted to the Wisconsin Bar and began a law practice in Sparta shortly afterwards. In the early 1880s, Gillett permanently relocated out of his native Wisconsin for the West, living briefly in both the Montana Territory and Washington Territory before moving to California. He settled in Eureka in 1884.

Once in Eureka, Gillett joined the state militia as a private in the Eureka Guard Company in 1885. Based primarily in Santa Cruz, Gillett's unit would be called into active military service only once, assisting Humboldt County sheriffs in protecting a local town jail during the height of Sinophobic riots in Eureka. Following the end of his state military service, Gillett quickly resumed his career as a lawyer. In 1890, Gillett became the Eureka City Attorney, holding the position until 1895.

By the mid-1890s, Gillett had become interested in state politics. Running as a Republican, Gillett was elected to the California State Senate in the 1896 general elections. After serving a single term in the State Senate, Gillett successfully ran for the U.S. House of Representatives in the 1902 House elections. He successfully defended his seat again in the 1904 elections.

Gillett's success in Washington was noticed by state Republicans and lobbyists for the Southern Pacific Railroad, who saw Gillett's politics as supporting their own corporate interests. Attending the state Republican convention in Santa Cruz in 1906, party machine boss Abe Ruef sought to replace incumbent Governor George Pardee with Gillett for the Republican gubernatorial nomination. Pardee, a physician and staunch Progressive and conservationist politician, openly opposed the Southern Pacific's monopoly over cargo and transportation, believing its business influence harmful to the state's economy and politics. In backroom deals, Southern Pacific lobbyists, including Ruef and Southern Pacific political bureau chief William Herrin, persuaded the attending Republican delegates to refuse Pardee renomination, instead handing the nomination to the railroad-friendly Gillett.  In response to their support, Gillett promised the Southern Pacific waterfront patronage.

The denying of Pardee's renomination caused immediate controversy and outrage. Pardee, due to his efficient bureaucracy and direction of the state government's response to the 1906 San Francisco earthquake, remained an enormously popular politician. His replacement by Gillett, a Railroad Republican, caused anger both in the press and within political circles. The San Francisco Call printed a photograph taken at the convention's end of Gillett among top party bosses entitled "the Shame of California." Gillett's nomination by special interests would fuel calls for a direct primary law in the state.

Despite his highly controversial nomination, Gillett would win the governorship in the 1906 general elections, defeating Democrat Theodore A. Bell, Socialist Austin Lewis, Prohibitionist James H. Blanchard, and William Langdon of the Independence League. Langdon's strong third place showing of 14.4% sapped votes away from both the popular contenders Gillett and Bell, yet enough to tip the balance in Gillett's favor.

Following his successful election, Gillett resigned from his U.S. House seat.

Governorship 
Inaugurated on January 9, 1907, as the 22nd Governor of California Gillett's agenda included the construction of more transcontinental railroads between California and the East. In addition, Gillett, like his predecessor Pardee, encouraged the California State Legislature to debate the direct primary, though remained vague on his support for any such law.   Gillett also included within his agenda the expansion of harbors, especially in the case of the Port of San Francisco following the 1906 firestorm, to keep up with the state's expanding commerce and ongoing population boom. Gillett also pushed bills through the Legislature to create state measures assisting federal food safety laws, particularly for the expanding fruit and California wine industries.

During his governorship, Gillett encouraged and signed laws to reform state parole guidelines, assisting prisoners to more quickly reform themselves and return as productive members of society. In 1907, he signed landmark amendments to the state's Poison Act prohibiting the sale of opium and cocaine except by a doctor's prescription, setting the stage for the state Board of Pharmacy to launch an aggressive crackdown on narcotics and Chinese smoking opium seven years before the Harrison Act.  In 1909, Gillett passed the state's first eugenics law, making it legal for state officials to sterilize mental patients considered clinically insane, prisoners exhibiting sexual or moral perversions, and anyone with more than three criminal convictions.   The law was passed unanimously in the Assembly, and had one dissenting vote in the Senate. Some 19,000 people were sterilized between 1909 and 1950, when eugenics became generally disfavored by the medical profession due to its connections with Nazi Germany.

As automobiles became more common along California's roads, Gillett agreed with the Legislature to pass the State Highway Bond Act of 1909. The act, which created a bond worth $18 million, effectively established the California state highway system. The system would collectively organize state roads, numbering them sequentially, and provide greater funds for maintenance and expansion.

Gillett's governorship, however, remained continually marred with controversy due to his Republican nomination by party machine business interests. Writing in The Los Angeles Examiner, influential cartoonist George Herriman continually depicted Governor Gillett as a mule for Southern Pacific interests. Indeed, while in office, Gillett appealed to the railroads to not levy excessive charges on shipping companies and municipalities, yet still warmly welcomed their economic and political presence in the state. His warm relations with the Southern Pacific led in part to rising Progressive anger within state Republican ranks, culminating in the election of Hiram Johnson and a large number of like-minded Progressive state legislators in the 1910 elections.

By 1910, Gillett was falling quickly into financial trouble, and decided not to seek re-election. Privately, however, it is believed that his wife, Isabella, did not want Gillett to continue the governorship.

Post governorship 
Following his departure from the Governor's Office, Gillett opened a law practice in San Francisco. From 1916 to 1920, Gillett worked in Washington, D.C., as an attorney and lobbyist for the San Francisco-based Associated Oil Company and the Oil Industry Association. Gillett's lobbying in the U.S. Congress helped secure passage of the Oil Leasing Bill in 1920, which pertained to leases in the naval petroleum reserves. Gillett would go on to represent many oil industry companies and individuals in oil lease matters. Throughout the 1920s Gillett completed over twenty years' work in obtaining compensation for the owners and crews of sailing vessels seized by the U.S. federal government in the Bering Sea between 1886 and 1894.

Gillett retired from the law practice in 1929, only to begin a new practice in 1934 in Oakland with his son, James Gillett, Jr.

Gillett died April 20, 1937 in Berkeley at the age of 76.

References

External links 
 
 James Norris Gillett Collection, 1880-1971.

Governors of California
California state senators
People from Viroqua, Wisconsin
People from Sparta, Wisconsin
People from Eureka, California
1860 births
1937 deaths
Republican Party governors of California
Washington, D.C., Republicans
Republican Party members of the United States House of Representatives from California